The following list shows the Nemzeti Bajnokság I top scorers season by season.

References

Handball trophies and awards
Awards established in 1959